Romedi Llapi (born 31 January 2002) is a footballer who plays as a midfielder for Burlington SC in League1 Ontario. Born in the United States and raised in Canada, he represented Albania at youth international level.

Early life
Born in Detroit, United States of America, Llapi grew up in Toronto, starting with local youth side East York SC at the age of five. Afterwards, he joined Wexford SC's Global Satellite Soccer Academy. In 2015, Llapi went on a six-week trial with English club Manchester City. andhas also attended trials with Bury FC, Bolton Wanderers and Tottenham Hotspurs. In 2017, Llapi was called into a talent identification camp for the Canada U15 team. In 2021, he had joined the youth system of Spanish club UD Alzira.

Club career
After progressing through Flamurtari's youth system, Llapi made his Albanian Superliga debut on 21 January 2020, coming on as a 69th-minute substitute for Arinaldo Rrapaj in a 2-0 away defeat to Vllaznia.

In 2021, he played one game for ProStars FC in League1 Ontario.

In 2022, he joined Burlington SC.

International career
Llapi is also eligible to play for the United States and Canada. In 2015, he attended a national team camp for the Canada U15 team.

In 2018, Llapi appeared for Albania U17 at the San Marino Cup.

References

External links

2002 births
Living people
Flamurtari Vlorë players
Albanian footballers
Albania youth international footballers
Association football midfielders
Burlington SC (League1 Ontario) players